The 1938 Idaho gubernatorial election was held on November 8. Incumbent Democratic governor Barzilla Clark ran for re-election, but was defeated in the August primary by former three-term governor C. Ben Ross. The general election was won by Republican nominee C. A. Bottolfsen, who received 57.30% of the vote.

Primary elections
Primary elections were held on August 9, 1938.

Democratic primary

Candidates
C. Ben Ross, Parma, former governor (three terms)
Barzilla Clark, Idaho Falls, incumbent governor
Charles Gossett, Nampa, lieutenant governor
W. P. Whitaker, Pocatello

Republican primary

Candidates
C. A. Bottolfsen, Arco newspaper publisher
R. H. Young, Parma farmer

General election

Candidates
Major party candidates
C. A. Bottolfsen, Republican 
C. Ben Ross, Democratic

Other candidates
R. B. Wilson, Independent

Results

References

1938
Idaho
Gubernatorial